The Sot River is a tributary of the Ganges in Uttar Pradesh, India. It flows close to Budaun city .

References

Rivers of Uttar Pradesh
Rivers of India
Budaun district